Julia Kurakina (1814–1881) was a Russian noblewoman and royal court official. She served as Ober-Hofmeisterin (Mistress of the Robes) or senior lady-in-waiting to empress Maria Feodorovna (Dagmar of Denmark) in 1866–1881.

Life 

She was the daughter of Fjodor Sergeevich Golitsyn and Anna Alexandrovna Prozorovskaya, and was the granddaughter of Sergei Fedorovich Golitsyn. She married the diplomat prince Alexei Borisovich Kurakin (1809—1872) in 1835.

She became senior lady-in-waiting to Maria Feodorovna in 1866. She remained in office after Maria Feodorovna became empress in 1881, but died later that same year, and was succeeded by Hélene Kotchoubey.

References 

Ladies-in-waiting from the Russian Empire
1814 births
1881 deaths
Golitsyn family